al-Bab District is a district of Aleppo Governorate in northern Syria. The administrative centre is the city of al-Bab.
   
The district was split in 2009, when three southern subdistricts were separated to form the new Dayr Hafir District. At the 2004 census, the remaining subdistricts had a total population of 201,589.

Subdistricts
The district of al-Bab is divided into four subdistricts or nawāḥī (population as of 2004):

References

 
Districts of Aleppo Governorate